Once Upon a Time in Manila is a 1994 Philippine action comedy film co-written and directed by Tony Y. Reyes. The film stars Vic Sotto, who co-wrote the story, and Cynthia Luster.

Plot
Vic Sotto plays a barangay tanod who always seems to have a knack for saving the local folks from dangerous situations, just in the nick of time. Cynthia Luster is Lt. Cynthia Wang, is a Royal Hong Kong Police on the look-out for Nikita, the infamous gang leader. Amparo Lagman (Gloria Sevilla), working as a domestic helper, becomes the unwitting target of the Nikita's gang when she comes into possession of some important documents and papers. Nikita follows her to the Philippines, along with Lt. Cynthia Wang who is in pursuit of Nikita.

A game of cat-and-mouse ensues as everyone gets swept up in a tale of international espionage with a dash of love and romance thrown into the crazy mix.

Cast
Vic Sotto as Jet Lagman
Cynthia Luster as Lt. Cynthia Wang
Gloria Sevilla as Amparo Lagman
Tiya Pusit as Panchang
Ruby Rodriguez as Carnap Victim
Babalu as Carnapper
Rio Diaz as Supermarket Cashier
Yoyong Martirez as Dong
Val Sotto as Sgt. Beltran
Larry Silva as Chairman Shepherd
Ritchie Reyes as Tom Crus
Yoyoy Villame as 'Bai
Mely Tagasa as Salome Yu
Romy Diaz as Mario
Charlie Davao as Luigi

References

External links

1994 action comedy films
1994 films
Philippine action comedy films
1990s Tagalog-language films
Harvest International Films films
M-Zet Productions films
Films directed by Tony Y. Reyes